The Unexpected Life is a 2014 Spanish-American comedy-drama film directed by  and written by Elvira Lindo, which stars Javier Cámara, Carmen Ruiz, Raúl Arévalo, Tammy Blanchard and Sarah Sokolovic.

Plot 
The plot concerns the developments following the meeting of Juanito (who settled in New York hoping to pursue an acting career), with his cousin, who arrives in NYC to pay Juanito a visit.

Cast

Production 
A Spanish-American co-production, The Unexpected Life was produced by Ruleta Media and La Vida Inesperada AIE alongside LVI Inc., with the participation of TVE, Canal+ and Cosmopolitan TV, collaboration of Numérica Films and support from ICAA and IVAC. Shooting began in New York City in March 2013.

Release 
The film was presented to the main competition of the 17th Málaga Film Festival on 28 March 2014, screened at the Teatro Cervantes. Distributed by Universal Pictures International Spain, the film opened in Spanish theatres on 25 April 2014.

Reception 
Jonathan Holland of The Hollywood Reporter considered the film to be "a wasted opportunity, largely because of a script which seems unable to decide whether it wants to deliver romance or reality", while noting that lead performers Cámara and Arévalo do not fail to deliver and the score by Godoy and Jusid "is a terrific piano and orchestra".

Carlos Marañón of Cinemanía rated the film 3½ out of 5 stars, assessing that, in a rare instance of "comedy film taking good people seriously", Torregrossa "has found the perfect bitter tone to make a comedy rise above its jokes", with the "invaluable" help from Carmen Ruiz.

Toni Vall of Ara scored 4 out of 5 stars, deeming The Unexpected Life to be "fatalistic and luminous", "a story in chiaroscuro, tinged with melancholy and inhabited by a beautiful realism".

Accolades 

|-
| align = "center" rowspan = "3" | 2015 || rowspan = "3" | 2nd Feroz Awards || colspan = "2" | Best Comedy Film ||   || rowspan = "3" | 
|-
| Best Actor || Javier Cámara || 
|-
| Best Original Music || Lucio Godoy, Federico Jusid || 
|}

See also 
 List of Spanish films of 2014

References 

2014 comedy-drama films
Spanish comedy-drama films
American comedy-drama films
Films set in New York City
Films shot in New York City
2010s Spanish-language films
2010s English-language films
2010s American films